A statue of Robert Raikes, often regarded as being the founder of Sunday schools, executed by the sculptor Thomas Brock, stands in Victoria Embankment Gardens, London, United Kingdom. It was unveiled by the Earl of Shaftesbury on 3 July 1880 and marked the centenary of the opening of the first Sunday school. The critic Edmund Gosse considered the statue to be "as good as anything of the kind we possess in England". In 1958 it was designated a Grade II-listed building.

The front of the plinth reads: . An inscription below the figure's right foot reads: 

In 1929 replicas of the statue were cast for erection the following year in Gloucester and Toronto, for the 150th anniversary the following year of opening of the first Sunday school.

References

External links
 

1880 establishments in England
1880 sculptures
Raikes, Robert
Monuments and memorials in London
Outdoor sculptures in London
Sculptures by Thomas Brock
Raikes, Robert
Victoria Embankment